Kevin Konrad Hanna,,is an American film director, writer and artist noted for his work in feature film animation, comic books, video games, and television, best known for directing the feature film The Clockwork Girl based on the graphic novel of the same name.

History
Forgoing a formal education in the arts, he started work in the video game industry when he was a teenager, where he worked on games for publishers such as Electronic Arts and Mattel.

He then left games for a stint in Hollywood where he worked on Roughnecks Starship Troopers, Max Steel and The Red Hot Chili Peppers music video for the single "Californication".

He then spent the following years at Microsoft becoming a founding member of the Xbox team, where he worked on Crimson Skies, Combat Flight Sim and Shadowrun for the Xbox 360.

In 2006 he co-founded X-Ray Kid Studios with Jeff Matsuda, Mike Christian and Brian Wyser.

He and his family then moved to California from Washington to work as an Art Director for Disney Interactive where he art directed and shipped over 50 titles.

In 2008, Hanna started the comic book publishing and multimedia company Frogchildren Studios, best known for publishing the comic book Sixteen Miles to Merricks and Creature Academy: The Legacy.

He currently lives in Washington working for Frogchildren Studios, an animation studio where he worked as a creative and artistic director on Google Lively, Kinect for Xbox 360, Disney XD and more.  On September 16, 2008, he was a keynote speaker at Game Developers Conference where he was the first to speak publicly on Google Lively, and announced Google's gaming intentions.

Most recently, he directed the animated feature film, The Clockwork Girl., the Huey Lewis and the News music video "While We're Young", as well as introductions for TV series The Magicians.

In 2022, along with Emerald City Comic Con founder Jim Demonakos, he directed Mike Mignola: Drawing Monsters a documentary about comic book creator Mike Mignola.

Film credits
 The Clockwork Girl (2014) -director/creator
 Mike Mignola: Drawing Monsters (2014) -director/producer

TV credits
 Max Steel (2001)
 "Red Hot Chili Peppers: Californication". (2000)
 Roughnecks: The Starship Troopers Chronicles (1999)
 Decrypting Krypton (2018) -director/creator
 Huey Lewis and the News: While We're Young (2020) -director

Comic book credits

 Frogchildren - creator/writer/artist (webcomic, 2005)
 Sixteen Miles to Merricks - editor (Frogchildren Studios, 2008)
 Clockwork Girl - co-creator/writer/artist (HarperCollins, 2011)
Arcana Studio Presents #6: "Creepsville" (with Bill Rude, Chris Wyatt and Brandon Graham, Arcana Studio, 2009)
 All-Star Western#1 - color assists (DC Comics, 2011)
 Creature Academy - creator/writer/artist  (Frogchildren Studios, 2013)
 Harley Quinn #28 - artist (dream sequence with Moritat) (DC Comics, 2016)

Video game credits

2003 - Crimson Skies: High Road to Revenge, 3d artist (Microsoft Game Studios)
2005 - Shadowrun, 3d artist (Microsoft Game Studios)
2007 - Disney’s Princess: Royal Adventure, art director (Disney)
2007 - Disney's Chicken Little: Ace in Action, art director (Disney)
2007 - High School Musical: Sing It!, art director (Disney)
2007 - Dance Dance Revolution Disney Channel Edition, art director (Disney)
2007 - Meet the Robinsons, art director (Disney)
2007 - Pirates of the Caribbean, art director (Disney)
2007 - Google Lively, creative director, art director (Google)
2010 - ESPN on Xbox Live, creative director, art director  (Microsoft Game Studios)
2012 - Ruby Blast, art director  (Zynga)
2013 - Puzzle Charms, art director (Zynga)
2016 - Plants vs. Zombies Heroes, art director (PopCap Games, Electronic Arts) (with Jordan Kotzebue, Chris Furnis and Stephen Byrne)
2019 - Best Fiends, commercial director (Seriously Digital Entertainment)  
2020 - Plants vs. Zombies 3, art director (PopCap Games, Electronic Arts)

Recognition

In 2008, Kevin Hanna received a Moonbeam Award for Best Graphic Novel for The Clockwork Girl,.
In 2008, The Clockwork Girl won Graphic Novel of the Year at Book Expo America by ForeWord magazine.
In 2010, The Clockwork Girl was A Mom's Choice Awards Gold Recipient: Comic Books & Graphic Novels.
 2022: FilmQuest Film Festival: Best Documentary for "Mike Mignola: Drawing Monsters" with collaborator Kevin Konrad Hanna
 2022: Gen Con Film Festival: Best Documentary for "Mike Mignola: Drawing Monsters" 
 2022: Chagrin Documentary Film Festival: Best Documentary for "Mike Mignola: Drawing Monsters" 
 2022: Fantasmagoria: Best Documentary for "Mike Mignola: Drawing Monsters" 
 2022: Prague Independent Film Festival: Best Documentary for "Mike Mignola: Drawing Monsters"

References

External links

newsarama Newsarama Interview

Living people
American male writers
American directors
American people of Arab descent
Hanna, Kevin
American animated film directors
American comics writers
American comics artists
American webcomic creators
Writers from Sunnyvale, California
Film directors from California
1980 births